The 32nd running of the Emakumeen Euskal Bira was held from 22 to 25 May 2019. Raced over four stages in the Basque Country, it was one of two women's cycling events at World Tour level in Spain, together with La Madrid Challenge. It was the 12th event of the 2019 UCI Women's World Tour.

Schedule

Teams
Twenty teams, each with a maximum of six riders, will start the race:

Leadership classification

See also
 2019 in women's road cycling

References

2019
2019 UCI Women's World Tour
2019 in Spanish road cycling
Emakumeen Euskal Bira